Oracle Clinical or OC is a database management system designed by Oracle to provide data management, data entry and data validation functionalities to support Clinical Trial operations.

The Major Functions Supported by Oracle Clinical are:
Clinical Study Database Design
Definition of Clinical Study Metadata to be collected
Creation of Data Management System to clean and reconcile patient data
Creation of Electronic Data Entry Screens
Ability to create both simple and complex validation edit checks and data derivations
Batch Data Loading and Extracting Capabilities
Thesaurus Management for Medical Coding of Verbatim Terms as reported by Investigators for Adverse Events, Medical History, and/or Concomitant Medications
Robust and Comprehensive Management of Laboratory Results against dynamic and demographic driven Reference Ranges

References

External links
 BioPharm Systems
Oracle software